Schooner Bay is a census-designated place (CDP) in Accomack County, Virginia, United States. It was first listed as a CDP in 2010. As of the 2020 census, it had a population of 97.

Geography
The CDP is located in west-central Accomack County and was constructed along the tidewater connecting Pompco Creek and Chesconessex Creek, two arms of Chesapeake Bay. Schooner Bay is located 7 miles (11 km) northwest of Accomac, the county seat, and is bordered to the east by the community of Deep Creek.

It lies at an elevation of 0 feet.

Demographics

2020 census

Note: the US Census treats Hispanic/Latino as an ethnic category. This table excludes Latinos from the racial categories and assigns them to a separate category. Hispanics/Latinos can be of any race.

References 

Populated places in Accomack County, Virginia
Census-designated places in Accomack County, Virginia
Census-designated places in Virginia